John Roman Brown (October 24, 1902 – November 25, 1987) was an American football player. He played college football at the University of Dayton and professional football in the National Football League (NFL) as a center, guard, and tackle for the Dayton Triangles. He appeared in 16 NFL games over the course of four seasons from 1926 to 1929.

References

1902 births
1987 deaths
Dayton Flyers football players
Dayton Triangles players
Players of American football from Ohio
People from Dayton, Ohio